The Ranger Creed is the official creed of the United States Army Rangers. The Ranger Creed was written in 1974 by CSM Neal R. Gentry, the original command sergeant major of the reactivated 1st Ranger Battalion. It was initiated by the Battalion Commander, then-LTC Kenneth C. Leuer, and re-drafted by the battalion XO, MAJ "Rock" Hudson and finalized at Fort Stewart, Georgia in 1974 when the original cadre deployed there on 1 July 1974. Today, members of Ranger community recite the Ranger Creed during formations, ceremonies, physical training activities and upon graduations from the Ranger Indoctrination Program, the Ranger Orientation Program and the U.S. Army Ranger Course.

Ranger Handbook version

Variations
The very first draft by CSM Neal R. Gentry used the phrasing "of the Ranger Battalion." Eventually, after some revisions on the overall creed, they settled on "of my Ranger Battalion." The Ranger School cadre later adopted the phrasing "of the Rangers" as seen in the Ranger Creed above. After the formation of the 75th Ranger Regiment, members of all battalions adopted the wording, "of my Ranger Regiment", and this version remains in use throughout the regiment.

See also
Soldier's Creed
Sailor's Creed
Airman's Creed
Code of the U.S. Fighting Force
Creed of the United States Coast Guardsman
Rifleman's Creed
Noncommissioned officer's Creed

References

United States Army Rangers
1974 documents
Warrior code